Santo Domingo Savio is the fourth and last station on line K of the Metrocable, and the first station on line L. It is located in the northeast of Medellín. The station is named after Dominic Savio.

References

External links
 Official site of Medellín Metro 

Medellín Metro stations